Swing Batta Swing is the debut studio album by American rapper K7. It was released on November 9, 1993 for Tommy Boy Records and was produced by Frankie Cutlass, K7, Joey Gardner and Mike Lorello. This album was released with 2 album covers. 

The album did fairly well on the charts, peaking at #96 on the Billboard 200, #54 on the Top R&B/Hip-Hop Albums and #1 on the Top Heatseekers. The album featured three hit singles, including his most popular song, "Come Baby Come", which made it to #18 on the Billboard Hot 100 and #9 on the Hot Rap Singles. Other singles include "Zunga Zeng" (#61 US, #23 US Rap) and "Move It Like This" (#54 US, #26 US Rap).

Track listing
"Come Baby Come" - 3:57  
"Let's Bang" - 4:56  
"Zunga Zeng" - 4:22  
"Hi De Ho" - 4:33  
"Body Rock" - 5:03  
"I'll Make You Feel Good" - 4:54  
"Move It Like This" - 5:07  
"Hang On in There Baby" - 3:03  
"Beep Me" - 3:42  
"Hotel Motel" - 3:39  
"A Little Help from My Friends" - 4:01  
"Move It Like This" [Alternate Mix] - 9:29

Samples
Come Baby Come
"Synthetic Substitution" by Melvin Bliss
"Straight Up" by Paula Abdul
"I'll Say It Again" by Sweet Linda Divine
Hi De Ho
"Minnie the Moocher" by Cab Calloway
Zunga Zeng
"Synthetic Substitution" by Melvin Bliss
"Zungguzungguguzungguzeng" by Yellowman
"Can I Get Some Help" by James Brown
A Little Help from My Friends
"Everybody Plays the Fool" by The Main Ingredient
"Monday, Monday" by The Mamas & the Papas

References

1993 debut albums
Tommy Boy Records albums